Prionosciadium thapsoides is a plant species native to the States of Veracruz and México, in the República de México, as well as Guatemala.

Prionosciadium thapsoides is a biennial herb with a large taproot. Leaves are bipinnately compound, the leaflets pinnately lobed with broad obovate lobes. Flowers are white, borne in dense compound umbels at the top of the flowering stalk.

Chemical studies have revealed the existence of several new dihydrofurochromones in the roots.

References

External links
photo of herbarium specimen at Missouri Botanical Garden, Prionosciadium thapsoides collected in Estado de México in 1935

Apioideae
Flora of Guatemala
Flora of the State of Mexico
Flora of Veracruz
Plants described in 1830
Taxa named by Augustin Pyramus de Candolle
Taxa named by Mildred Esther Mathias